Carate Airport  is a concrete airstrip serving the coastal destination of Sirena, in Osa Peninsula, Costa Rica. The airport in mainly used by charter services with tourists visiting the beaches near Sirena town and the Corcovado National Park. The airport currently does not have scheduled services from any other airport.

In 2014, 406 passengers traveled to Sirena Aerodrome, according to the operator, the Directorate General of Civil Aviation.

Passenger Statistics
These data show number of passengers movements into the airport, according to the Directorate General of Civil Aviation of Costa Rica's Statistical Yearbooks.

References

External links
Playa Carate.com - Information about Carate town, beaches and airport

Airports in Costa Rica
Buildings and structures in Puntarenas Province